Ceratophyllus avicitelli is a species of flea in the family Ceratophyllidae. It was described by Ioff in 1946.

References 

Ceratophyllidae
Insects described in 1946